Eating to Extinction: The World's Rarest Foods and Why We Need to Save Them is a 2022 book by Dan Saladino that examines rare foods. The book has five "positive" reviews and six "rave" reviews, according to review aggregator Book Marks.

References

2022 non-fiction books
English-language books
Farrar, Straus and Giroux books